Yona Okoth (1926–2001) was an Anglican archbishop in Uganda.

Okoth was educated at Buwalasi Theological College. He was ordained in 1956. He served in the Upper Nile region from 1954 to 1961; and was Diocesan Treasurer of Mbale from 1961 to 1964. He was Provincial Secretary of the Anglican Church of Uganda from 1965 to 1972 when he was appointed bishop of Bukedi. He was consecrated archbishop of Uganda in 1984 and was in office until 1995.

References

20th-century Anglican bishops in Uganda
20th-century Anglican archbishops
Bulwalasi Theological College alumni
Uganda Christian University alumni
Anglican bishops of Bukedi
1926 births
2001 deaths